Jayrone Carez Elliott (born November 11, 1991) is an American football outside linebacker who is currently a free agent. He played college football at Toledo, and was signed by the Green Bay Packers as an undrafted free agent in 2014.

College career
Elliott attended Glenville High School. He accepted a football scholarship from the University of Toledo. He became a starter at defensive end as a senior, registering 70 tackles (third on the team), 9 sacks (led the team), 14 tackles for loss (led the team) and 5 forced fumbles (led the team). He finished his career with 47 games (12 starts), 124 tackles (22½ for loss), 16 sacks, 6 forced fumbles and 4 passes defensed.

Professional career

Green Bay Packers
After going undrafted in the 2014 NFL Draft, Elliott signed with the Green Bay Packers on May 12, 2014. He was one of two undrafted players to make the Packers' opening day roster after posting 5 sacks in the preseason. Also had 1 sack his 1st year

Elliott earned an NBC game ball during the Packers' September 20, 2015, win against the Seahawks on Sunday Night Football. Elliott had one interception and forced a fumble that ended the Seahawks' last drive.

On March 14, 2017, Elliott signed a one-year contract extension with the Packers.

Dallas Cowboys
On September 3, 2017, the Dallas Cowboys acquired Elliott from the Packers in exchange for a 2018 conditional seventh-round pick, to provide depth at linebacker while Anthony Hitchens recovered from a tibial plateau fracture in his right knee and Damien Wilson resolved legal pending issues and a probable suspension. On September 19, 2017, he was waived in order to activate defensive end Damontre Moore.

New Orleans Saints
On January 23, 2018, Elliott signed a reserve/future contract with the New Orleans Saints. He was released on September 1, 2018.

San Antonio Commanders (AAF)
In December 2018, Elliott signed with the San Antonio Commanders of the AAF. In the opening week, Elliot was credited with 3 tackles and half a sack. The following game, Elliot strip sacked Orlando quarterback Garrett Gilbert; Elliot's teammate, Joey Mbu who is also a former Green Bay Packer, recovered the ball for a San Antonio touchdown. By the time the AAF suspended operations, Elliot proved to be one of the league's best pass rushers by recording an all-time AAF record 7.5 sacks through 8 games, forcing 4 fumbles, and creating numerous quarterback pressures.

Miami Dolphins
After the AAF suspended football operations, Elliott signed with the Miami Dolphins on April 9, 2019. He was released on July 24, 2019.

Pittsburgh Steelers
Elliott signed with the Pittsburgh Steelers on August 22, 2019. He was released on August 31, 2019. He was re-signed by the Steelers on September 10, 2019. He was released on October 11, and re-signed by the team on October 23. He was released on October 31 and re-signed on November 14. Elliott was waived again two days later.

Elliott re-signed with the Steelers once again on August 27, 2020. He was waived on September 5, 2020 and was signed to the practice squad the next day. He was elevated to the active roster on October 24 and October 31 for the team's weeks 7 and 8 games against the Tennessee Titans and Baltimore Ravens, and reverted to the practice squad after each game. He was promoted to the active roster on November 7.

NFL career statistics

Regular season

Postseason

References

External links

1991 births
Living people
Players of American football from Cleveland
American football defensive ends
American football linebackers
Toledo Rockets football players
Green Bay Packers players
Dallas Cowboys players
New Orleans Saints players
San Antonio Commanders players
Miami Dolphins players
Pittsburgh Steelers players
Ed Block Courage Award recipients